Kareh Tavi (also Romanized as Kareh Tāvī and Kareh Ţāvī; also known as Kareh Tābī) is a village in Rahmat Rural District, Seyyedan District, Marvdasht County, Fars Province, Iran. At the 2006 census, its population was 1,072, in 257 families.

References 

Populated places in Marvdasht County